Ildrim (foaled in 1897) was an American Thoroughbred racehorse best known for winning the 1900 Belmont Stakes at Morris Park Racecourse in The Bronx, New York under future U.S. Racing Hall of Fame jockey, Nash Turner.

At age three, Ildrim also won the Baychester Stakes, ran second in the important Lawrence Realization at Sheepshead Bay Race Track, and was third in the Withers Stakes at Morris Park.

References
 May 25, 1900 New York Times article on Ildrim winning the Belmont Stakes

1897 racehorse births
Racehorses bred in the United States
Racehorses trained in the United States
Belmont Stakes winners
Thoroughbred family 12-b
Godolphin Arabian sire line